Seremban Jaya is a state constituency in the state of Negeri Sembilan. The state constituency was first contested in 2018 and is mandated to return a single Assemblyman to the Negeri Sembilan State Legislative Assembly under the first-past-the-post voting system.

The voter demographics in this state constituency is 52.81% Chinese, 24.08% Indian, 22.22% Malay and 0.88% Others.

Polling districts 
Taman Seremban, Kampung Bahru Rahang, Senawang Jaya, Taman Seremban Jaya

History

References 

Negeri Sembilan state constituencies